Alexander Stirling Brown Ferguson (5 August 1903 – 23 November 1974) was a Scottish professional footballer.  Born in Lochore, he played for Wigan Borough, Gillingham, Swansea Town, Bury, Newport County, Bristol City and Swindon Town between 1924 and 1949.

Personal life 
Ferguson's older brother Jim was also a professional goalkeeper.

References

1903 births
1974 deaths
Scottish footballers
Wigan Borough F.C. players
Gillingham F.C. players
Swansea City A.F.C. players
Bury F.C. players
Newport County A.F.C. players
Bristol City F.C. players
Swindon Town F.C. players
Association football goalkeepers